The American University of Ras Al Khaimah (AURAK) is a higher education university located in the city of Ras al-Khaimah, United Arab of Emirates. Founded in 2009, AURAK is an independent not for profit public university, accredited to UAE Ministry of Higher Education and Scientific Research. The medium of education in the university is English.

Fields of Education 
The University offers Bachelors, Masters and Doctoral programs in the following fields:

Engineering
Healthcare
Information Technology
 Business Development
 Sales
 Marketing
 Media and Communications
 Finance

Partnerships 
The university has partnered with various organisations for exposure and learning of students. Some of the partnering organisations are:

George Mason University
 La Rochelle Business School
Konkuk University
 RAK Chamber
 Department of Economic Development, The Ras Al Khaimah Government
RAK Hospital
 RAK Bank

See also 

 Education in the United Arab Emirates

References 

Universities and colleges in the Emirate of Ras Al Khaimah
Public universities